Husák or Husak is a surname which may refer to:

 Emil J. Husak (born 1930), American politician
 Gustáv Husák (1913–1991), Slovak politician, president of Czechoslovakia and a long-term General Secretary of the Communist Party of Czechoslovakia
 Patrik Husák (born 1990), Czech ice hockey player
 Todd Husak (born 1978), American football quarterback
 Walter J. Husak (born 1942), American coin collector and business owner

See also